Saint James's Church, is a church in Munich. It serves the School Sisters of Our Blessed Lady as a monastery church.

The church contains the grave of Blessed Maria Theresia Gerhardinger.

References

External links 

 

Jakob's Church, Munich